End of All Days is the twelfth studio album by the German heavy metal band Rage.

Track listing

Personnel

Band members 
Peter "Peavy" Wagner – vocals, bass, arrangements, producer
Sven Fischer – guitars, additional engineering
Spiros Efthimiadis – guitars
Chris Efthimiadis – drums

Additional musicians 
Christian Wolf – orchestration

Production 
Ulli Pössell – producer, engineer, mixing
George Marino – mastering

References 

1996 albums
Rage (German band) albums
GUN Records albums